William Hatch (born ) is a Democratic member of the New Hampshire House of Representatives.

He resides in Gorham, New Hampshire, and serves as vice chair of the House's Ways and Means Committee. He represents the area of Coos County,  District 03, which includes the towns of Gorham and Shelburne, as well as some unincorporated areas.

References

Democratic Party members of the New Hampshire House of Representatives
Living people
Year of birth missing (living people)
21st-century American politicians
People from Coös County, New Hampshire